Cryptandra ericoides, commonly known as heathy cryptandra, is a species of flowering plant in the family Rhamnaceae and is endemic to south-eastern continental Australia. It is a wiry, low-lying to erect shrub with often clustered, cylindrical leaves, and tube-shaped white flowers arranged in clusters on the ends of branchlets.

Description 
The leaves are often clustered at the ends of branchlets.

Taxonomy
Cryptandra ericoides was first formally described in 1808 by James Edward Smith in The Cyclopaedia from specimens collected by "Dr. White". The specific epithet (ericoides) means "Erica-like".

Distribution and habitat
Heathy cryptandra mainly grows in heath on the coast of new South Wales south from the Sydney region. It is also found in the extreme east of Victoria.

Conservation status
Cryptandra ericoides is listed as "critically endangered" in Victoria, under the Flora and Fauna Guarantee Act 1988.

References

ericoides
Rosales of Australia
Flora of New South Wales
Flora of Victoria (Australia)
Plants described in 1808
Taxa named by James Edward Smith